Rosmalen is a town in the province of North Brabant, in the south of the Netherlands. The town is located 6 kilometers east of the city of 's-Hertogenbosch (Den Bosch) and has been part of that municipality since 1996. Its population is around 37,240 on 1 January 2021. In 2005 the town began construction of a new neighbourhood,  (named after the large kolks in the area created by flood water), to include 5,000 homes and other buildings.

Rosmalen has a significant and locally well known football club, OJC Rosmalen. Many players from OJC have played for professional football clubs, like FC Den Bosch, RKC Waalwijk, Willem II. Rosmalen is also the home of the second-largest basketball club in the Netherlands: The Black Eagles. Well-known players like Kees Akerboom, Jr., Thijs Vermeulen, Robin Goossens and Rob van Mil demonstrate the success of the club in developing talented players.

The park hosts an annual international tennis tournament in the summer, the Rosmalen Grass Court Championships. The park is located about 7 km east of 's-Hertogenbosch and can be reached via the A59.

See also
Eikenburg
Markt, Rosmalen
Rosmalen Noord

References

External links

Municipalities of the Netherlands disestablished in 1996
Populated places in North Brabant
Former municipalities of North Brabant
's-Hertogenbosch